The 2013–14 ABA League was the 13th season of the ABA League, with 14 teams from Serbia, Slovenia, Montenegro, Croatia, Bosnia and Herzegovina, Macedonia and Hungary participating in it.

Regular season started on October 4, 2013, and lasted until March 31, 2014. The Final Four took place from April 24 to 27, 2014.

Team information

Head coaches

Coaching changes

Regular season
The regular season began on October 4, 2013, and it will end on March 31, 2014.

Standings

Schedule and results
Source:

Final four
Matches played on 24–27 April 2014 in Kombank Arena, Belgrade, Serbia.

Semifinals

Final

Top 10 attendances

Single game

Average

Updated to games played on 31 March 2014

Source:    ABA League

Stats leaders

MVP Round by Round
{| class="wikitable sortable" style="text-align: center;"
|-
! align="center"|Round
! align="center"|Player
! align="center"|Team
! align="center"|Efficiency
|-
|1||align="left"| Malcolm Armstead||align="left"| Krka||30
|-
|2||align="left"| Léo Westermann||align="left"| Partizan NIS||31
|-
|3||align="left"| Todor Gečevski||align="left"| MZT Skopje Aerodrom||39
|-
|4||align="left"| Siniša Štemberger||align="left"| Igokea||35
|-
|5||align="left"| Tarence Kinsey||align="left"| Partizan NIS||32
|-
|6||align="left"| Willie Warren||align="left"| Szolnoki Olaj||50
|-
|7||align="left"| Ratko Varda||align="left"| Mega Vizura||40
|-
|8||align="left"| Boban Marjanović||align="left"| Crvena zvezda Telekom||34
|-
|rowspan=3|9||align="left"| Miro Bilan||align="left"| Cedevita||28
|-
|align="left"| Bogdan Bogdanović||align="left"| Partizan NIS||28
|-
|align="left"| Willie Warren (2)||align="left"| Szolnoki Olaj||28
|-
|10||align="left"| Jerel Blassingame||align="left"| Cibona||33
|-
|11||align="left"| Sava Lešić||align="left"| Radnički||41
|-
|12||align="left"| Edo Murić||align="left"| Krka||32
|-
|13||align="left"| Sava Lešić (2)||align="left"| Radnički||28
|-
|14||align="left"| Marko Jagodić-Kuridža ||align="left"| Cibona||32
|-
|rowspan=2|15||align="left"| Jerel Blassingame (2)||align="left"| Cibona||32
|-
|align="left"| Dario Šarić||align="left"| Cibona||32
|-
|rowspan=3|16||align="left"| Deividas Gailius ||align="left"| Union Olimpija||29
|-
|align="left"| Sava Lešić (3)||align="left"| Radnički||29
|-
|align="left"| Dario Šarić (2)||align="left"| Cibona||29
|-
|17||align="left"| Charles Jenkins||align="left"| Crvena zvezda Telekom||30
|-
|18||align="left"| Ivan Buva||align="left"| Široki Primorka||31
|-
|19||align="left"| Bogdan Bogdanović (2)||align="left"| Partizan NIS||35
|-
|20||align="left"| Marko Marinović ||align="left"| Radnički||35
|-
|21||align="left"| Marin Rozić ||align="left"| Cibona||40
|-
|22||align="left"| Nikola Ivanović ||align="left"| Budućnost VOLI||36
|-
|23||align="left"| Aleksandar Cvetković||align="left"| MZT Skopje Aerodrom||33
|-
|rowspan=2|24||align="left"| Johnathon Jones ||align="left"| Široki Primorka||31
|-
|align="left"| Branko Jorović ||align="left"| Igokea||31
|-
|25||align="left"| Dario Šarić (3)||align="left"| Cibona||30
|-
|26||align="left"| Nenad Miljenović ||align="left"| Mega Vizura ||31
|-
|SF||align="left"| Dario Šarić (4)||align="left"| Cibona||29
|-
|F||align="left"| Dario Šarić (5)||align="left"| Cibona||33

Ranking MVP

Points

Rebounds

Assists

The ideal five and coach of the season
The ideal five of the season selected by the fans and head coaches of the ABA League teams.

References

External links
 Official website
 ABA League at Eurobasket.com

2013–14
2013–14 in European basketball leagues
2013–14 in Serbian basketball
2013–14 in Slovenian basketball
2013–14 in Croatian basketball
2013–14 in Bosnia and Herzegovina basketball
2013–14 in Montenegrin basketball
2013–14 in Hungarian basketball
2013–14 in Republic of Macedonia basketball